Regal Records was a Spanish record label from the late 1920s, which was linked to USA Columbia Records.

References

See also
 List of record labels
 Regal Records (disambiguation)

Spanish record labels